John Dwyer is a former police officer serving as the Conservative Party Cheshire Police and Crime Commissioner since 2021, and previously from 2012 to 2016.

Dwyer was the first person to hold the post and was elected on 15 November 2012. He was defeated by the Labour Party candidate David Keane at the 2016 election. He successfully stood against Keane at the 2021 election, becoming the first PCC to serve on non-consecutive terms.

Dwyer was previously a borough councillor and is based in Nantwich. He is a retired Assistant Chief Constable of Cheshire Constabulary.

References

External links
 Official website

Police and crime commissioners in England
Living people
Year of birth missing (living people)
People from Nantwich
Councillors in Cheshire
Conservative Party (UK) councillors
Conservative Party police and crime commissioners
British police chief officers